Alderman Blaxill School was a secondary school with academy status in Colchester, Essex, and was the town's smallest secondary school. It closed in 2014.

History

Alderman Blaxill Secondary Modern School in Walnut Tree Way, Colchester, was opened in 1955.  It replaced the former Hamilton Road Central School (built in 1914, but used as a military hospital during World War I,not opening as a school until 1920. Following the Education Act 1944, it became a secondary modern school. In 1955, the secondary part of the school moved to the new building in Walnut Tree Way, Shrub End, and was renamed Alderman Blaxill after a former Mayor of Colchester and chairman of the education committee.  The Hamilton Road building was used for infants and juniors.   In 1976, Alderman Blaxill became a comprehensive school. It became an academy in 2012, and closed in 2014. The majority of the students transferred to The Stanway School and Thomas Lord Audley School, with which Alderman Blaxill was federated.

Legacy
Following the closure of the school in July 2014, the buildings were maintained for temporary use by children from the Market Field School in Elmstead Market, which was being rebuilt at the time. Demolition of the school commenced in October 2017.

See also
Secondary schools in Essex

References

External links

School Ofsted report

Educational institutions established in 1920
1920 establishments in England
Defunct schools in Essex
Educational institutions disestablished in 2014
2014 disestablishments in England
Buildings and structures demolished in 2017
Demolished buildings and structures in England